"The One You Slip Around With" is a single by American country music artist Jan Howard. Released in October 1959, the song reached #13 on the Billboard Hot Country Singles chart, becoming Howard's first major hit single. The single was later released on the 1962 album, Jan Howard, issued on Wrangler Records. The song was written by her husband and Nashville songwriter, Harlan Howard.

The song was later recorded by Jann Browne and released on her 1990 debut album Tell Me Why.

Chart performance

References 

1959 singles
Jan Howard songs
Jann Browne songs
Songs written by Harlan Howard
1959 songs